Sylvia Skinner Andersen was a Republican member of the Utah House of Representatives for the 48th House district (which largely consists of Sandy, Utah) from 2006 to 2008.  Andersen was a member of the Utah Legislative Cultural Caucus.

Andersen was defeated in the Republican caucus by LaVar Christensen, who had been the State Representative for the district until he ran for the United States House against Jim Matheson in 2006.

Other activities
Andersen is the CEO of the N.E.C. Group, a company that runs home shows in Utah and California. She also holds a position in the Sandy Chamber of Commerce.

Sources

Living people
American women chief executives
Members of the Utah House of Representatives
Women state legislators in Utah
People from Sandy, Utah
Businesspeople from Utah
Place of birth missing (living people)
Year of birth missing (living people)
Chief executive officers in the real estate industry
Women in Utah politics
American real estate businesspeople
21st-century American politicians
21st-century American women politicians